Mehdili or Mekhdili or Mekhtili or Mekhtily may refer to:
Mehdili, Barda, Azerbaijan
Mehdili, Jabrayil, Azerbaijan
Mehdili, Kurdamir, Azerbaijan
Mehrili (disambiguation), several places in Azerbaijan